Meenakshi Mukherjee (died 16 September 2009, aged 72) was a litterateur and Sahitya Akademi Award winner. Her book, "An Indian for all seasons", a biography of historian R.C. Dutt, published by Penguin, was to be released in Delhi. Mukherjee received the Sahitya Akademi award in 2003 for her book The Perishable Empire: Essays on Indian Writing in English. She taught English literature and Critical theory at several colleges in Patna, Pune, Delhi and University of Hyderabad. Her last and longest spell was as Professor of English in the Jawaharlal Nehru University, New Delhi.  She was a visiting professor in several universities outside India, including the University of Texas at Austin, the University of Chicago, the University of California at Berkeley, Macquarie University (Sydney), the University of Canberra and Flinders University (Adelaide).  Her husband Sujit Mukherjee, was a teacher and a literary scholar. They had two daughters. They lived the final years of their lives in Hyderabad.

References

External links
Book review by Meenakshi Mukherjee
Tributes to Meenakshi Mukherjee

Recipients of the Sahitya Akademi Award in English
20th-century Indian women writers
20th-century Indian educators
Women educators from Andhra Pradesh
Educators from Andhra Pradesh
Indian women essayists
20th-century Indian biographers
2009 deaths
Women biographers
20th-century women educators